Jean Willes (born Jean Donahue; April 15, 1923 – January 3, 1989) was an American film and television actress. She appeared in approximately 65 films in her 38-year career.

Early years
Willes was born Jean Donahue In Los Angeles. She spent part of her childhood in Seattle and part in Salt Lake City. After she and her parents returned to Los Angeles, she began acting with a little theater group there.

Career
Willes began using her married name for billing in 1947. Her first film was The Winner's Circle (1948).

Willes is familiar to modern viewers for her roles in several Three Stooges short subjects, such as Monkey Businessmen as well as A Snitch in Time, Don't Throw That Knife and Gypped in the Penthouse. She was a favorite of director Edward Bernds, who cast her in many shorts and features. She played roles ranging from an Air Force captain to prostitutes. She was one of the "four queens" pursuing Clark Gable in The King and Four Queens (1956). Later that year she appeared as Nurse Sally Withers in the original movie version of Invasion of the Body Snatchers.

She made the transition to television, debuting in an episode of Boston Blackie. She appeared in dozens of series in varied roles and genres such as Westerns and anthology series, Crossroads, The Caliifornians, Richard Diamond, Private Detective with David Janssen, several episodes of the Burns and Allen television series titled The George Burns and Gracie Allen Show, in the 1956 television show The Great Gildersleeve as the scheming girlfriend Eva Jane in the episode "One Too Many Secretaries," The Twilight Zone ("Will the Real Martian Please Stand Up?"), four episodes of Bonanza between 1959 and 1968, Hazel, Trackdown ("The Bounty Hunter" with Robert Culp and Steve McQueen), The Munsters, Perry Mason, The Alfred Hitchcock Hour, Bat Masterson with Gene Barry, The Beverly Hillbillies with Buddy Ebsen, McHale's Navy with Ernest Borgnine, Tombstone Territory, Dick Powell's Zane Grey Theatre, Walt Disney's Zorro with Guy Williams, and Kojak with Telly Savalas.

In 1958, in the episode "Queen of the Cimarron" of the syndicated western television series Frontier Doctor, starring Rex Allen, Willes portrayed Fancy Varden, the owner of the Golden Slipper Saloon who attempts to establish her own cattle empire with animals infected with anthrax.

Willes portrayed Belle Starr in a 1959 episode of the ABC/Warner Brothers Western series Maverick entitled "Full House," in which Joel Grey played Billy the Kid and James Garner performed a bravura pistol-twirling exhibition woven into the plot. In the same year for Warners she played Anna Sage in The FBI Story. Willes played the character Ruth in the Wanted: Dead or Alive episode, "The Eager Man", Manila Jones in "The Montana Kid", and Meghan Francis in "The Kovack Affair", all three times opposite series star Steve McQueen.

Willes played Amelia Monk in the 1967 episode, "Siege at Amelia's Kitchen",  on the syndicated  anthology series, Death Valley Days hosted by Robert Taylor.

Personal
Willes's second husband was NFL football player Gerard Cowhig. The couple had one son, Gerry.

Death
Willes died of liver cancer in Van Nuys, California on January 3, 1989. She was 65 years of age. She is buried in San Fernando Mission Cemetery in Mission Hills, California.

Selected filmography

 So Proudly We Hail! (1943) as Lt. Carol Johnson
 Here Come the Waves (1944) as Johnny Cabot Fan (uncredited)
 Salty O'Rourke (1945) as The Other Girl (uncredited)
 You Came Along (1945) as Showgirl (uncredited)
 Incendiary Blonde (1945) as Nightclub Patron (uncredited)
 Monkey Businessmen (1946, Short) as Nurse Shapely (uncredited)
 Sing While You Dance (1946) as Miss Flint
 Blondie Knows Best (1946) as Dr. Titus's Nurse / Receptionist (uncredited)
 Cigarette Girl (1947) as D.A.'s Secretary (uncredited)
 Down to Earth (1947) as Betty
 Blondie in the Dough (1947) as Miss Marsh, Thorpe's Secretary (uncredited)
 The Mating of Millie (1948) as Party Girl (uncredited)
 The Winner's Circle (1948) as Jean Trent
 Chinatown at Midnight (1949) as Alice
 A Woman of Distinction (1950) as Pearl - Switchboard Operator (uncredited)
 Kill the Umpire (1950) as Pretty Girl (uncredited)
 David Harding, Counterspy (1950) as Nurse (uncredited)
 The Petty Girl (1950) as Fleeing Chorine (uncredited)
 The Fuller Brush Girl (1950) as Mary (uncredited)
 Emergency Wedding (1950) as Guest (uncredited)
 A Snitch in Time (1950, Short) as Miss Gladys Scudder
 Revenue Agent (1950) as Marge King
 Don't Throw That Knife (1951, Short) as Lucy Wyckoff
 Never Trust a Gambler (1951) as The Brunette at Police Station (uncredited)
 The Family Secret (1951) as Cigarette Girl (uncredited)
 Hula-La-La (1951, Short) as Luana
 The First Time (1952) as Fawn Wallace (uncredited)
 Jungle Jim in the Forbidden Land (1952) as Denise
 The Sniper (1952) as Woman on Street (uncredited)
 A Yank in Indo-China (1952) as Cleo
 Gobs and Gals (1952) as Mrs. Riley - Gerrens' Secretary (uncredited)
 Son of Paleface (1952) as Penelope (uncredited)
 Torpedo Alley (1952) as Peggy Moran (uncredited)
 All Ashore (1953) as Rose
 Abbott and Costello Go to Mars (1953) as Capt. Olivia
 Run for the Hills (1953) as Frances Veach
 From Here to Eternity (1953) as Annette, club receptionist (uncredited)
 The Glass Web (1953) as Sonia
 A Star Is Born (1954) as Fan at benefit show (uncredited)
 Masterson of Kansas (1954) as Dallas Corey - aka Mrs. Bennett
 Bowery to Bagdad (1955) as Claire Culpepper
 5 Against the House (1955) as Virginia
 Gypped in the Penthouse (1955, Short) as Jane
 Count Three and Pray (1955) as Selma (uncredited)
 Bobby Ware Is Missing (1955) as Janet Ware
 The Lieutenant Wore Skirts (1956) as Joan Sweeney
 Invasion of the Body Snatchers (1956) as Nurse Sally Withers
 The Revolt of Mamie Stover (1956) as Gladys
 Toward the Unknown (1956) as Carmen (uncredited)
 The King and Four Queens (1956) as Ruby McDade
 The Man Who Turned to Stone (1957) as Tracy
 Hell on Devil's Island (1957) as Suzanne
 The Tijuana Story (1957) as Liz March
 Hear Me Good (1957) as Rita Hall
 Desire Under the Elms (1958) as Florence Cabot
 Trackdown (1958) "The Bounty Hunter" as Jannette York
 No Time for Sergeants (1958) as WAF Captain
 Official Detective (1958, TV Series) as Pat Dengue
 Lawman (1958, TV Series) as Kate Wilson
 These Thousand Hills (1959) as Jen
 Bat Masterson (1959) as Grace Williams 
 The FBI Story (1959) as Anna Sage
 Yancy Derringer (1960, TV Series) as Jessie Belle
 Elmer Gantry (1960) as Prostitute (uncredited)
 Ocean's 11 (1960) as Gracie Bergdof
 The Crowded Sky (1960) as Gloria Panawek
 By Love Possessed (1961) as Junie McCarthy
 The Twilight Zone (1961, TV Series) "Will the Real Martian Please Stand Up?" as Ethel McConnell, the dancer
 Gun Street (1961) as Joan Brady
 Gypsy (1962) as Betty Cratchitt
 The Beverly Hillbillies (S2 Ep62 1963-4) |Beverly Hillbillies (1963-4) as Countess Maria
 McHale's Navy (1964) as Margot Monet
 Bonanza (1968) as Mrs. O'Brien
 The Cheyenne Social Club (1970) as Alice
 Bite the Bullet (1975) as Rosie

References

External links

 
 

1923 births
1989 deaths
20th-century American actresses
Actresses from Greater Los Angeles
American film actresses
Deaths from cancer in California
Deaths from liver cancer
American expatriates in Mexico